This is a list of islands of France, including both metropolitan France and French overseas islands.

Ranking of French islands

By area 

By population 

List of the most populated French islands.

Islands of metropolitan France

Atlantic coast
List of inhabited islands of Atlantic France:

Normandy

Brittany

Ille et Vilaine

Côtes-d'Armor

Finistère

Morbihan

Pays de la Loire

Poitou-Charentes

Aquitaine

Banc d'Arguin
Île aux oiseaux (in Arcachon Bay)
Phare de Cordouan

Mediterranean coast

Languedoc-Roussillon

Fort de Brescou

Provence-Alpes-Côte-d'Azur

Corsica

Islands in lakes and rivers

Alsace 
Grande Île, in Strasbourg on the Ill River

Île-de-France

Midi-Pyrénées 
Île du Ramier,  in Toulouse on the Garonne River

Pays de la Loire 
Île de Nantes,  in Nantes on the Loire River
Béhuard,  in the Loire River

French overseas islands

Indian Ocean

Mayotte (in the Indian Ocean) 

 Île Bambo
 Île Bouzi
 Île Brandélé
 Îles Choazil
 Grande-Terre (or Mahoré)
 Îles Hajangoua
 Île Handréma
 Île Mtsamboro
 Petite Terre (or Île Pamanzi)

Réunion (in the Indian Ocean)
 Réunion

Scattered Islands (or Îles Éparses) in the Indian Ocean

 Banc du Geyser
 Bassas da India
 Glorioso Islands
 Île Glorieuse (or Grande Glorieuse)
 Île du Lys (or Petite Glorieuse)
 Les Roches Vertes
 Europa Island
 Juan de Nova
 Tromelin Island

Antarctica

Adélie Land

 Archipel de Pointe Géologie
 Île Alexis Carrel
 Île Buffon
 Île Claude Bernard
 Île Curie
 Île Cuvier
 Île de la Vierge
 Île des Damiers
 Île des Pétrels
 Île du Bélier
 Île du Capricorne
 Île du Gouverneur
 Île du Lion
 Île du Navigateur
 Île du Sagittaire
 Île du Scorpion
 Île du Taureau
 Île Jean Rostand
 Île Lamarck
 Île Verte
 Îles des Poissons
 Îlot de la Balance
 Îlot de la Baleine
 Îlot de la Dent
 Îlot de la Selle
 Îlot des Champignons
 Îlot du Cancer
 Îlot du Marégraphe
 Îlot du Mystère
 Îlot du Verseau
 Îlot Juliette
 Îlot Roméo
 Îlots des Hydrographes
 Le Mauguen
 Mid-Winter
 Rocher Gris

Crozet Islands (in the Indian Ocean)

 Îles des Apôtres
 Île aux cochons
 Île de l'Est
 Île des pingouins
 Île de la possession

Kerguelen Islands (in the Indian Ocean)

Saint Paul and Amsterdam Islands (in the Indian Ocean)
 Île Amsterdam
 Île Saint-Paul

North America

Caribbean

Guadeloupe (in the Caribbean Sea)

Martinique (in the Caribbean Sea)

Saint Barthélemy (in the Caribbean Sea) 
 Saint Barthélemy

Saint Martin (in the Caribbean Sea) 

 Saint Martin (shared with the Kingdom of the Netherlands)
 Île Tintamarre

Northern America

Saint Pierre and Miquelon (in the North Atlantic Ocean) 

 Grand Colombier
 Langlade
 L'Île-aux-Marins
 Miquelon
 Île aux Pigeons
 Saint Pierre Island
 Île aux Vainqueurs
 Green Island (Fortune), Newfoundland and Labrador ("Île Verte") (uncertain sovereignty between France and Canada)

Oceania

Clipperton Island (in the North Pacific Ocean)
 Clipperton Island

French Polynesia (in the South Pacific Ocean)

New Caledonia (in the South Pacific Ocean)

Wallis and Futuna (in the South Pacific Ocean)

South America

French Guiana

 Îles du Salut
 Île du Diable
 Île Royale
 Île Saint-Joseph
 Îlets de Rémire
 Îlet la Mère
 Constable Islands
 Île Portal

See also 
List of Antarctic and subantarctic islands
List of Caribbean islands
List of French islands in the Indian and Pacific oceans
List of islands
List of islands in the Arctic Ocean
List of islands in the Atlantic Ocean
List of islands in the Indian Ocean
List of islands in the Pacific Ocean

References

External links 

France

Islands